Corynellus cinnabarinus is a species of beetle in the family Cerambycidae. It was described by Chemsak and Linsley in 1979.

References

Pteroplatini
Beetles described in 1979